The 1989 Tasmanian state election was held on 13 May 1989 in the Australian state of Tasmania to elect 35 members of the Tasmanian House of Assembly. The election used the Hare-Clark proportional representation system — seven members were elected from each of five electorates. The quota required for election was 12.5% in each division.

The incumbent Liberal government headed by Robin Gray hoped to secure a third term in office. The Labor Party was headed by Michael Field. The Green independents were headed by Bob Brown. The Australian Democrats contested all electorates except Braddon. Green candidates were run in all electorates where they previously only fielded candidates in the south.

Prior to the election the Liberals held 19 of the 35 seats in parliament. The Labor Party held 14 and there were two Green independents.

To date, this is the last election that a Premier, in Gray, had fought a second consecutive election.

Results

|}

Distribution of votes

Primary vote by division

Distribution of seats

Aftermath
After the election the Liberals had lost majority by one seat and the Greens gained the balance of power.

The Labor Party had suffered a minor swing against them, losing one seat in Lyons to the Greens.

The Greens succeeded in electing one member to every electorate. This election victory would help form the official party of today's  Tasmanian Greens. Bob Brown topped the poll in Denison and was first member elected. Their primary vote of 17.1% was a record for Green movements and wouldn't be beaten until the 2002 Tasmanian election.

Labor Party leader Michael Field formed a loose alliance with the Greens which became known as the Labor–Green Accord.

The Liberals determined to stay in government; tried to call a second election. Gray started a petition which attracted many signatures. Edmund Rouse attempted to bribe newly elected Labor member Jim Cox with $110,000 if he would cross the floor to support Gray instead of Field. Cox refused and reported the bribe to police. Rouse served 18 months in gaol and allegations surfaced that the Liberal party was involved. A later inquiry concluded there was no evidence Gray was connected to the bribe.

After the alliance was formed, the Greens joined with Labor to vote down the Liberals' choice for Speaker.  Now realising he faced certain defeat on the floor of the legislature, Gray resigned and Michael Field became Premier.

See also
Candidates of the 1989 Tasmanian state election
Members of the Tasmanian House of Assembly, 1989–1992

References

Parliament of Tasmania election results

Elections in Tasmania
1989 elections in Australia
1980s in Tasmania
May 1989 events in Australia